Morgan Thomas Lewis Irwin (born 1983) is an American law enforcement officer and politician from Washington. Irwin is a former Republican member of Washington House of Representatives, representing the 31st Legislative District from 2017 to 2021. He previously was the ranking Republican member on the House Civil Rights & Judiciary Committee.

Education 
In 2007, Irwin earned a Bachelor's degree in Agricultural Business / Economics from Washington State University.

Career
Irwin was a police officer with Seattle Police Department.

Irwin was first appointed in 2017, filling a vacancy caused by Representative-elect Phil Fortunato's selection to succeed Senator Pam Roach, who had resigned to join Pierce County Council. After being retained to fill remainder of his term in a 2017 special election, he was reelected in 2018.

Irwin gained notoriety in 2018 when he stole a jet ski on Lake Washington in order to contact two kayakers who were pretending to be in distress.

Awards 
 2020 Guardians of Small Business. Presented by NFIB.

Personal life 
Irwin's wife is Melissa Irwin. They have three children. Irwin and his family live in Enumclaw, Washington.

References

External links 
 Morgan Irwin at ballotpedia.org

1983 births
Living people
21st-century American politicians
American police officers
Republican Party members of the Washington House of Representatives
People from Enumclaw, Washington
Seattle Police Department officers